The Coroners Act 2006 is an Act of the Parliament of New Zealand which completely reformed the Coronal services and introduced the office of Chief Coroner and clarified matters related the working conditions of coroners and their remuneration.
 
Coroners inquests in New Zealand are inquisitorial rather than adversarial; they are fact-finding exercises rather than methods of apportioning guilt.

The Act was prompted by a 2000 New Zealand Law Commission report which recommended a number of changes.

See also
Coroners Act

References

External links
 New Zealand Law Commission Report 62: Coroners, August 2000
 Coroners Act 2006

Statutes of New Zealand
Coroners
2006 in New Zealand law
Death in New Zealand